Parornix subfinitimella is a moth of the family Gracillariidae. It is known from Turkmenistan.

The larvae feed on Crataegus turkestanica. They mine the leaves of their host plant.

References

Parornix
Moths of Asia
Moths described in 1956